Alan West (born 18 December 1951 in Hyde, Cheshire) is an English retired football central midfielder. He attended Greenfield Street Boys' Secondary Modern School in Hyde, Cheshire.

West began his career at Burnley, a product of the club's prolific youth system. In 1973, he was set for a move to Sunderland but was told by medical staff that he had a condition which meant he would be crippled if he continued playing. He believed there was nothing wrong, and moved to Luton Town that year.

He spent eight seasons at Luton Town, becoming an important player as well as club captain. West made his name as a cultured midfielder who though not prolific was a fine passer of the ball. He was ever-present in his one top-flight season with the Hatters (1974–75). In 1976, he moved the Minnesota Kicks of the North American Soccer League, playing with the team through the 1979 season. Moving to Millwall in 1981, West spent two seasons there before moving on to non-League football - as manager of Isthmian League strugglers Hitchin Town, being sacked in September 1988 after a poor start to the season.

West is now a pastor at a local church in Luton, named Luton Christian Fellowship. He is also the Club Chaplain at Luton Town Football Club.

References

External links

1951 births
Living people
Burnley F.C. players
English footballers
England under-23 international footballers
English expatriate footballers
Luton Town F.C. players
Millwall F.C. players
Minnesota Kicks players
North American Soccer League (1968–1984) players
Association football midfielders
English expatriate sportspeople in the United States
Expatriate soccer players in the United States